Punavirus is a genus of viruses in the order Caudovirales, in the family Myoviridae. Bacteria serve as natural hosts. There are four species in this genus.

Taxonomy
The following four species are assigned to the genus:
 Aeromonas virus 43
 Escherichia virus P1
 Escherichia virus RCS47
 Salmonella virus SJ46

Structure
Viruses in Punavirus are non-enveloped, with icosahedral and head-tail geometries. The diameter is around 85 nm. Genomes are circular, around 100kb in length. The genome codes for 100 proteins.

Life cycle
Viral replication is cytoplasmic. Entry into the host cell is achieved by adsorption into the host cell. DNA-templated transcription is the method of transcription. Bacteria serve as the natural host. Transmission routes are passive diffusion.

References

External links
 Viralzone: Punalikevirus
 ICTV

Myoviridae
Virus genera